Kate Richardson (born 1984), is a Canadian gymnast.

Kate or Katie Richardson may also refer to:

 Katie Richardson (born 1988), Australian beauty pageant winner
 Kate Richardson (athlete) (born 1973), Australian long-distance runner
Kate Richardson (swimmer) in Swimming at the 2006 Commonwealth Games – Women's 200 metre freestyle

See also
 Kate Richardson-Walsh (born 1980), English field hockey player
 Katherine Richardson (disambiguation)